Lawrence E. Cunningham (March 1, 1852 – 1924) was a member of the Wisconsin State Senate.

Born in Beloit, Wisconsin, Cunningham was elected to the Senate from the 22nd District in 1912 and reelected in 1916, serving until January 1921. Additionally, he served four terms as Mayor of Beloit. Cunningham was a Republican.

References

Politicians from Beloit, Wisconsin
Mayors of places in Wisconsin
Republican Party Wisconsin state senators
1852 births
1924 deaths